The Under-Secretary of State for the Colonies was a junior Ministerial post in the United Kingdom government, subordinate to the Secretary of State for the Colonies and, from 1948, also to a Minister of State.

Under-Secretaries of State for the Colonies, 1768–1782

In 1782, following the loss of the American colonies, the office was abolished, and its duties given to the Home Secretary. From there it passed to the War Office, which was later renamed the War and Colonial Office. In 1854 this office was split, and the Colonial Office reestablished.

Parliamentary Under-Secretaries of State for the Colonies, 1854–1966

For earlier office-holders see Under-Secretary of State for War and the Colonies.

Abolished 1966. Thereafter, see Under-Secretary of State for Commonwealth Affairs.

Minister of State for the Colonies, 1948–1964Abolished 1964. Thereafter, see Minister of State for Commonwealth Affairs.''

Permanent Under-Secretaries of State for the Colonies, 1825 and 1854–1966

References

Colonies
Defunct ministerial offices in the United Kingdom
1768 establishments in Great Britain
1966 disestablishments in the United Kingdom

Foreign Office during World War II